Englewood Avenue station is a light rail station on the MBTA Green Line C branch located in the median of Beacon Street just west of Englewood Avenue in Brookline, Massachusetts. The station consists of two low side platforms which serve the C branch's two tracks. Englewood Avenue is not accessible.

Track work in 2018–19, which included replacement of platform edges at several stops, triggered requirements for accessibility modifications at those stops. By December 2022, design for Englewood Avenue and seven other C Branch stations was 15% complete, with construction expected to take place in 2024.

References

External links

MBTA - Englewood Avenue
 Station from Google Maps Street View

Green Line (MBTA) stations
Railway stations in Brookline, Massachusetts